Albi Skendi (born 26 September 1993) is an Albanian professional footballer who plays as a defender.

Early life
Skendi was born in Albania, with his family fleeing the country to Greece, Skendi lived with his grandmother until he was aged five. Skendi joined his family in Greece for a year, before relocating permanently to Oxford in England.

Career

Early career
Skendi's career began in the lower leagues of England with Oxford City and Banbury United. Skendi had two spells with each team, helping Oxford City to the Nomads Hellenic League Championship in the 2011–12 season before joining Southern Football League side Banbury United in November 2012. He returned to Oxford City before going back to Banbury after struggling for playing time in the National League North with Oxford at the start of the 2013 season. During his second-spell at Banbury, Skendi reportedly considered quitting the game and struggled with disciplinary issues.

Move to the United States
In 2015, Skendi opted to stop playing professionally and moved to the United States to study finance at Santa Barbara City College. He played a single season of college soccer with the Vaqueroes in 2015, making 20 appearances, scoring two goals and tallying two assists. He transferred to Marymount California University and played with the team's soccer team in 2016.

In the summer of 2018, Skendi also played with amateur United Premier Soccer League side L.A. Wolves.

Return to England
In 2018, Skendi opted to return to England to continue playing footballer, joining Stratford Town for a season. Skendi made the move up the divisions in the summer of 2019, signing with National League side Yeovil Town. He went on to score nine goals in 73 appearances for the Glovers, becoming a fan favourite along the way.

Prior to the 2021 season, Skendi was under contract with Yeovil, but hadn't returned to the club from the United States and remained absent from the club. He was reported to have played California with singer Justin Bieber with local side Churchhome FC. On March 4, 2022 it was announced he had officially left Yeovil

Orange County SC
On 4 March 2022, Skendi signed with USL Championship club Orange County SC. He debuted for the club on 12 March 2022 as an 83rd–minute substitute during a 1–2 loss to Colorado Springs Switchbacks.

References

1993 births
Living people
Association football defenders
Association football midfielders
Oxford City F.C. players
Banbury United F.C. players
Stratford Town F.C. players
Yeovil Town F.C. players
Orange County SC players
Southern Football League players
National League (English football) players
Albanian footballers
Albanian expatriate footballers
Albanian expatriates in the United States
Expatriate soccer players in the United States
Albanian expatriates in England